Christopher Rougier-Lagane (born 24 September 1998) is a Mauritian cyclist, who rides for Mauritian amateur team Faucon Flacq SC–KFC. He has won the Mauritian national time trial championships five times, and has competed at the 2018 and 2022 Commonwealth Games.

Career
In 2015 Rougier-Lagane went to France for the third consecutive year as a junior to race as part of a development squad.
At the national hill climb championships Rougier-Lagane won the overall posting a quicker time than everyone in every category.
While riding the Tour Antenne Réunion, in 2022, he fell sick and went from first overall to seven minutes down in stage three. he eventually abandoned before Stage 6.
In 2022 Rougier-Lagane won the Tour de Maurice for the second time. 

His best UCI result other than the national championships came in 2023 where he placed third overall in La Tropicale Amissa Bongo.

Major results

2015
 National Junior Road Championships
1st  Road race
1st  Time trial
2016
 National Junior Road Championships
1st  Road race
1st  Time trial
 African Junior Road Championships
2nd  Road race
2nd  Time trial
 2nd Overall 
2017
 1st  Time trial, National Road Championships
 1st Overall 
2018
 National Road Championships
1st  Time trial
2nd Road race
 1st Overall 
1st Stages 4 & 7 (ITT)
 2nd Overall 
 4th Overall Tour de Limpopo
2019
 1st  Time trial, National Road Championships
 Indian Ocean Island Games
1st  Team time trial
2nd  Time trial
3rd  Road race
 3rd Overall 
1st Prologue (TTT) & Stage 5
2020
 2nd Time trial, National Road Championships
2021
 1st  Time trial, National Road Championships
 1st Overall 
1st Stages 2, 3, 4 (ITT) & 6
2022
 1st  Mixed relay TTT, African Road Championships
 National Road Championships
1st  Time trial
5th Road race
 1st Overall 
1st Stages 2, 3 (ITT) & 5
2023
 African Road Championships
1st  Mixed relay TTT
5th Time trial
6th Road race
 3rd Overall La Tropicale Amissa Bongo

References

External links
 

1998 births
Living people
Mauritian male cyclists
People from Plaines Wilhems District
Competitors at the 2015 African Games
Cyclists at the 2018 Commonwealth Games
Cyclists at the 2022 Commonwealth Games
Commonwealth Games competitors for Mauritius